Algutsrum Hundred, or Algutsrums härad, was a hundred of Öland in Sweden, located on the west side of the island in modern-day Mörbylånga Municipality.

Hundreds of Öland